Brent Park may refer to:
Brent Park, Hendon, a public park in Hendon, London
Brent Park, Neasden, a retail area in Neasden, London